The 1995 European Beach Volleyball Championships were held in August, 1995 in Saint-Quay-Portrieux, France. It was the third official edition of the men's event, which started in 1993, while the women competed for the second time.

Men's competition

Women's competition

References
 Results

1995
E
B
B